John Vincent Nelson (born July 11, 1998) is an American professional soccer player who plays as a defender for Major League Soccer club St. Louis City. He sometimes goes by the name Johnny Nelson.

Career

Youth & College
John grew up in Medina, Ohio. In 2010, he joined Internationals SC, as a member of the U.S. Soccer Development Academy, in which he was a member of until 2017. While a graduate of Medina High School, Nelson did not play for the school's boys' soccer team. Upon graduating high school, Nelson attended the University of North Carolina at Chapel Hill, where he played college soccer for two years between 2017 and 2018, making 41 appearances, scoring 1 goal and tallying 3 assists.

While in college, Nelson played in the PDL with North Carolina FC U23 and Tobacco Road FC.

Nelson opted to leave college early and signed a Generation Adidas contract with MLS ahead of the 2019 MLS SuperDraft.

Professional career
On January 11, 2019, Nelson was drafted 10th overall in the 2019 MLS SuperDraft, by FC Dallas. Following the 2021 season, Nelson's contract option was declined by Dallas.

Nelson officially signed with FC Cincinnati on January 6, 2022, after having his rights acquired by Cincinnati in Stage 2 of the 2021 MLS Re-Entry Draft in December 2021.

Career statistics

Club

References

External links 
 
 
 

1998 births
Living people
American soccer players
Association football defenders
FC Cincinnati players
FC Dallas draft picks
FC Dallas players
Major League Soccer players
North Carolina FC U23 players
North Carolina Tar Heels men's soccer players
North Texas SC players
People from Medina, Ohio
Soccer players from Ohio
Sportspeople from Greater Cleveland
Tobacco Road FC players
USL League Two players